Jean Nicolle (19 July 1614 - 12 April 1650) was a French Norman painter and musician.

Jean Nicolle was born in Louviers in 1614, the fourth child of Louis Nicolle and Marguerite Coyplet. Both his father Louis and his uncle, Marin Nicolle, also painted. He discovered painting at a young age and showed an early talent, painting Saint Adrien, en costume Henri IV for the hospice in Louviers at age 10. On 22 November 1639 he married Anne David (born 1617), with whom he had nine children.

He found a patron in Claude Baudry of Piencourt, the abbot in nearby La Croix-Saint-Leufroy. Some of his paintings decorate the choir of Notre-Dame de Louviers, while others are at the City Museum.

Gallery

References 

17th-century French painters
French male painters
1650 deaths
People from Louviers

1614 births